The following lists events that happened during 1958 in Laos.

Incumbents
Monarch: Sisavang Vong 
Prime Minister: Souvanna Phouma (until 17 August), Phoui Sananikone (starting 17 August)

Events
March–April - Operation Booster Shot

May
4 May - 1958 Laotian parliamentary election

References

 
1950s in Laos
Years of the 20th century in Laos
Laos
Laos